Malcolm Macgregor Summers  (1924September 1987) was a senior Australian public servant. He is best known for his time as Secretary of the Department of Shipping and Transport from 1969 to 1972.

Life and career
Summers was born in Queensland in 1925. He joined the Commonwealth Public Service in 1941 and moved to Canberra in the early 1950s to work for the Burueau of Census and Statistics.

In March 1969, Summers was appointed Secretary of the Department of Shipping and Transport, a promotion from his position as deputy secretary of the Department of Trade and Industry. In the role, he worked to set up the Bureau of Transport Economics and brought in new funding arrangements for national highways, rail, urban transport, shipping and road safety. The department's involvement in policy issues increased substantially during the time that Summers was its secretary.

In December 1972, the department was reformed as the Department of Transport. Summers was Secretary until late 1973 when then Prime Minister Gough Whitlam announced he was to become the sole Commissioner of a Commonwealth Inquiry into the maritime industry.

Summers retired in 1976 due to ill health.

He died in 1987. His wife Betty had died in 1972.

Awards
Summers was made a Commander of the Order of the British Empire in June 1976 for his public service.

References

1924 births
1987 deaths
Australian public servants
Australian Commanders of the Order of the British Empire